Pirkko-Liisa Kyöstilä is a Finnish diplomat. She is the Finnish Ambassador and Chief of the Finnish Liaison Office to Ramallah from September 1, 2014. She started working at the Ministry for Foreign Affairs in 1987.

Prior to Ramallah, Kyöstilä worked in the Ministry of Foreign Affairs Development Policy Department as Head of the Non-Governmental Organizations Unit since 2011. Prior to that she was Chargé d'Affaires at the Embassy of Finland in Nepal, Kathmandu from 2007 to 2011. She had previously worked on development and development policy at the Ministry for Foreign Affairs and the Finnish diplomatic missions in Dar es Salaam, Rome and in Paris at the OECD Delegation.

References

Ambassadors of Finland to the State of Palestine
Living people
Year of birth missing (living people)
Finnish women ambassadors